Ferrous is an Indian crime drama feature film written, directed and produced by writer/director Shaurya Singh under his banner Silver Rain Pictures in collaboration with Amrit Sinha of Tanay Films International.  Ferrous was premiered at RTF 2018, an International Film Festival held at Lagos, Nigeria in July 2018, in front of a packed International audience where it was judged Best Foreign Film.

Plot
Set in the current day Mumbai, the film is a crime drama. Ferrous is a non-linear screenplay film in which rather than pushing and pulling the film in past and present, the whole structure of the film is non-linear. The audience has to perceive the film and join the dots of the story in order to comprehend the complete set of events in sequential order.

Cast
 Vijay Raaz as The Cleaner
 Zakir Hussain as Minister Madhyadheesh
 Bikramjeet Kanwarpal as Inspector Jagdeesh Sinchwal
 Gopal K Singh as Madan
 Pankaj Jha as Matin Khan
Manish Khanna as The Sniper
Myra Singh as Sana 
Diaansh Sharma as Ajay
Maruf Khan as Vishambhar (Minister's Secretary)

Production 
The pre-production of the film was started in October 2017 and the production completed in March 2018. The film is extensively shot in Mumbai .

Accolades

References

Indian crime drama films
2018 films